Anthony Julian (March 25, 1902 – January 18, 1984) was a United States district judge of the United States District Court for the District of Massachusetts.

Education and career

Julian was born in Italy and emigrated to the United States while a child. He received an Artium Baccalaureus degree from Boston College in 1925 and a Juris Doctor from Harvard Law School in 1929. He was in private practice in Boston, Massachusetts from 1929 to 1953. He was town counsel of Watertown, Massachusetts from 1930 to 1932 and from 1941 to 1942. He was a faculty member at Boston College from 1934 to 1937, and was a member of the Massachusetts House of Representatives from 1937 to 1938. He was in the United States Army Judge Advocate General's Corps during World War II, from 1942 to 1946, achieving the rank of Major. He was the United States Attorney for the District of Massachusetts from 1953 to 1959.

Federal judicial service

On September 9, 1959, Julian was nominated by President Dwight D. Eisenhower to a seat on the United States District Court for the District of Massachusetts vacated by Judge Bailey Aldrich. Julian was confirmed by the United States Senate on September 9, 1959, and received his commission on September 10, 1959. He served as Chief Judge from 1971 to 1972, assuming senior status on August 1, 1972. Julian served in that capacity until his death on January 18, 1984, in Boston.

See also
 1937–1938 Massachusetts legislature

References

Sources
 

1902 births
1984 deaths
Boston College alumni
Harvard Law School alumni
Italian emigrants to the United States
Judges of the United States District Court for the District of Massachusetts
United States district court judges appointed by Dwight D. Eisenhower
20th-century American judges
United States Attorneys for the District of Massachusetts
United States Army officers
20th-century American lawyers
American people of Italian descent